Ghauttham is a 2009 Kannada romance film directed by K. Rajeev Prasad and starring Prem Kumar and Sarah in the lead roles with Kokila Mohan, Sudharani and Ananth Nag in other pivotal roles.

The film is a remake of the Tamil family drama Aahaa..! (1997) directed by Suresh Krissna. The film received favorable reviews upon release.

Cast
Prem Kumar as Gowtham
Sarah as Madhu
Kausalya
Ananth Nag
Kokila Mohan
Sudharani
Vinaya Prakash
Ramesh Bhat
Mandeep Roy
Shivaram
Bindushree
Bank Janardhan

Soundtrack
The film's score and soundtrack was composed by Gurukiran.

Reception

Critical response 

R G Vijayasarathy of Rediff.com scored the film at 2.5 out of 5 stars and says "Gauththam also marks the return of "Kokila" Mohan (Mike Mohan in Tamil films) and Kausalya to Kannada film industry, who have well in their respective roles. Notable performances from Sudharani, Anant Nag, Ramesh Bhat, Vinaya Prakash and Shivaram are another plus point of the film. Technical value of the film too is top class. Despite its dragging moments and predictable story line, Gauththam is a neat family entertainer". A critic from Sify.com wrote  "Gurukiran is good in three tunes for the film and the other beauty of the film is the camera work by Sudhakar. Every frame of the film is gleeful. This is an above average film".

References

Kannada remakes of Tamil films
Indian romantic drama films
2009 films
2000s Kannada-language films
Films scored by Gurukiran
2009 romantic drama films